Shawn Brenneman (born 6 August 1973 from Woodstock, Ontario) is a former Canadian professional darts player who played in Professional Darts Corporation events.

Career
Brenneman made his PDC debut at the 2008 Las Vegas Desert Classic, but who lost to Andy Hamilton of England.

Brenneman made his World Series of Darts debut at the 2017 US Darts Masters, where he lost to Peter Wright of Scotland. He also qualified for the 2019 US Darts Masters, where he lost to eventual champion Nathan Aspinall.

Brenneman Quit the PDC in 2020.

References

External links

1973 births
Living people
Canadian darts players
Professional Darts Corporation associate players
Sportspeople from British Columbia
People from Princeton, British Columbia